The Nissan FM platform is a modern FR automobile layout. The name is derived from the "front midships" location of the engine, with its center of mass located behind the front axle centerline, shifting weight to the middle of the car, leaving the front suspension less encumbered. The engine is pushed as far back to the firewall as possible, creating a weight distribution  close to 50:50 and enabling the front wheels to be placed close to the corners  for better handling. This platform debuted with the 2001 V35-series Infiniti G-series/Nissan Skyline, and was then used as the basis of nearly all of Nissan's rear and all-wheel drive applications. The platform was revised for use in the JDM Nissan Fuga/USDM Infiniti M35/45, being stretched in wheelbase and reinforced for additional torsional rigidity, a version referred to as the "enhanced FM" platform. The GT-R is built on Nissan's Premium Midship (PM) platform, an evolution of the Front Midship (FM) architecture.

Applications (FM Platform)
 Infiniti G35/Nissan Skyline V35-series
 Infiniti G25/G35/G37/Infiniti Q40/Nissan Skyline V36-series
 Infiniti Q50/Nissan Skyline V37-series
 Infiniti Q60 CV36-series 
 Infiniti Q60 CV37-series 
 Infiniti M35/M45/Nissan Fuga Y50-series
 Infiniti M25/M37/M56/M35h/M30d/Infiniti Q70/Q70L/Nissan Fuga/Nissan Cima Y51-series
 Infiniti EX/Infiniti QX50/Nissan Skyline Crossover J50-series
 Infiniti FX S50-series
 Infiniti FX/Infiniti QX70 S51-series
 Mitsubishi Proudia BY51-series
 Mitsubishi Dignity BHGY51-series
 Nissan 350Z Z33-series
 Nissan 370Z Z34-series
 Nissan Z RZ34-series
 Nissan Stagea M35-series

Applications (PM Platform)

 Nissan GT-R R35-series (PM platform)

FM